Yersinia wautersii is a species of Gram-negative bacteria that was originally called the Korean Group of the Yersinia pseudotuberculosis complex. The type strain is 12-219N1 (=CIP 110607 =DSM 27350).

Etymology
Yersinia wautersii, wau.ter.si’i N.L. gen. masc. n. wautersii, named in honor of Professor George Wauters, a Belgian microbiologist who contributed an in depth characterization of the genus Yersinia, including the biotyping scheme of Yersinia enterocolitica.

References

External links
LPSN: Species Yersinia wautersii

wautersii
Bacteria described in 2014